Joseph-Édouard Turcotte (October 10, 1808 – December 20, 1864) was a lawyer and political figure in Canada East.

He was born in Gentilly, Lower Canada in 1808. He studied at the Séminaire de Nicolet. In 1831, he lost his right arm in an accident. Deciding not to pursue a future in the priesthood, he studied law with Elzéar Bédard and was called to the bar in 1836. He practice law at Quebec City and then Trois-Rivières. He became a supporter of Louis-Joseph Papineau and supported the parti patriote. In 1841, he was elected to the Legislative Assembly of the Province of Canada for Saint-Maurice; he opposed the union of the Canadas. He was forced to resign because he had accepted two government posts, but was reelected in an 1842 by-election; he was defeated in 1844. He was named solicitor general for Canada East in 1847 but was forced to resign in 1848 after two unsuccessful attempts to gain a seat in the assembly. In 1851, Turcotte was elected again in Saint-Maurice; in 1854, he was elected in Maskinongé as a Reformer. He served as mayor of Trois-Rivières from 1857 to 1863. In 1858, he was elected to the assembly for Champlain, now as a member of the parti bleu; in 1861, he was elected in Trois-Rivières. He served as speaker from 1862 to 1863. He was reelected in Trois-Rivières in 1863 and served until his death in Trois-Rivières in 1864.

Turcotte also played an important role in the economic development of the region, including railway links and the founding of a college there. He owned and was of the Journal des Trois-Rivières from 1847 to 1853.

His son Arthur Turcotte served as a member in the Legislative Assembly of Quebec and his son Gustave-Adolphe-Narcisse was a member of the Canadian House of Commons. His daughter Marie-Louise married Ernest Pacaud, a Quebec lawyer and journalist.

External links
 

1808 births
1864 deaths
Mayors of Trois-Rivières
Members of the Legislative Assembly of the Province of Canada from Canada East
People from Centre-du-Québec